Dudi Sela was the defending champion but lost in the second round to Liam Broady.

Cedrik-Marcel Stebe won the title after defeating Jordan Thompson 6–0, 6–1 in the final.

Seeds

Draw

Finals

Top half

Bottom half

References
Main Draw
Qualifying Draw

Odlum Brown Vancouver Brown
Vancouver Open